Helsingborg is a town in Sweden.

Helsingborg may also refer to:
 Helsingborg BBK, a basketball club
 Helsingborgs IF, a football club
 Helsingborgs HC, an ice hockey club
 , several ships of the Swedish Navy

See also
Battle of Helsingborg (disambiguation)